David Střihavka (born 4 March 1983) is a Czech former professional footballer who played as a forward. He is head coach of Slavia Prague's U15 team.

Strihavka moved from Baník Ostrava to Norwich City in July 2007 and was the first Czech player to play for the club. Norwich terminated his contract on 11 January 2008. In June 2011 he joined to MŠK Žilina.

Club career

In the Czech Republic
Střihavka played for many sides in his native country, including Bohemians Prague, Sparta Prague, FK Jablonec, Chmel Blšany and Banik Ostrava.

His career failed to get off the ground in the First Division and first made an impact in the Second Division with Bohemians Prague. This earned him a move to Sparta where he played in the 2004–05 Champions League with them.

Norwich City
On 11 July 2007, it was confirmed that Střihavka had signed for Norwich City for an undisclosed fee, reported to be around €1 million, on a four-year deal at a press conference at the team's Colney Training ground. He made his first appearance for Norwich on Saturday 14 July 2007, in a friendly match away at Exeter City, with the home team winning 2–1. Střihavka scored his first goal for Norwich City on Wednesday 25 July 2007, in a friendly match in the Netherlands against FC Zwolle, a game which the Canaries went on to lose 2–1.

Střihavka's first competitive goal came in Norwich's 1–0 win against Crystal Palace at Carrow Road on 15 September 2007, as he headed in a flick-on from Dion Dublin. He was booked for over-celebrating, as he jumped into the crowd. Střihavka was unable to add to his solitary goal for the club and failed to settle and establish himself in English football. His contract was terminated on 11 January 2008. 

After leaving Norwich, Střihavka joined Czech league leaders Slavia Prague. His first game for them was in the UEFA Cup against Tottenham Hotspur, in which he scored his first goal for the club in a 2–1 defeat.

Tatran Prešov
Střihavka joined 1. FC Tatran Prešov in February 2012 on a half-year loan from MŠK Žilina.

International career
Střihavka was part of the Czech Republic Under-16s that took part in UEFA Under-16 Championship in Israel in 2000, in which they were defeated by Portugal. Two years later in 2002, Střihavka played in the UEFA Under-19 Championship and scored twice against Andorra. He has not been selected for the senior Czech squad.

Coaching career
Retiring due to a brain tumor at the end of 2015, Střihavka began his coaching at his former youth club, Bohemians 1905, where his little son also played. He then had a short spell at FK Meteor Prague VIII, before returning to Bohemians to coach the club's U18s.

After working with Slavia Prague's U19 team, he was promoted to assistant coach for the club's B-team in February 2019. In June 2020 it was confirmed, that he would be the head coach of Slavias' U15s for the new season.

Honours
Viktoria Plzeň
 Czech Cup: 2010

Notes

External links
 
 
 David Střihavka stats at Slavia Prague official website
 Interview with David Střihavka – Slavia Prague official website (Czech)

1983 births
Living people
Footballers from Prague
Czech footballers
Association football forwards
Czech expatriate footballers
AC Sparta Prague players
FK Jablonec players
FK Chmel Blšany players
FC Baník Ostrava players
FC Viktoria Plzeň players
1. FK Příbram players
Norwich City F.C. players
Willem II (football club) players
Czech First League players
MŠK Žilina players
1. FC Tatran Prešov players
FK Dukla Banská Bystrica players
Racing Club Beirut players
Slovak Super Liga players
Eredivisie players
Expatriate footballers in England
Expatriate footballers in the Netherlands
Expatriate footballers in Slovakia
Expatriate footballers in Lebanon
Al Ahed FC players
Lebanese Premier League players
Czech expatriate sportspeople in Lebanon